Kshana Kshana is a 2007 Indian Kannada language crime thriller film directed by Sunil Kumar Desai and produced by B. R. Thirumalai. The film stars Aditya, Prema, Kiran Rathod and Ashutosh Rana in the lead roles with actor Vishnuvardhan appearing in a special role.

The film released on 1 June 2007 across Karnataka to positive response from the critics. However upon release, the film generally met with average reviews from audiences. The core storyline of the movie - the protagonist, a well-known person in his/her profession, fearing that he/she is being targeted by an unknown person who wants to kill him/her for his past unknown deeds, hiring a detective/bodyguard who in turn fakes few attacks on the protagonist to gain his/her confidence and finally the original assailant turning out to be a person very close to the protagonist - is loosely based on Sidney Sheldon's first novel The Naked Face (1970).

Plot
Samarth returns from Switzerland to India and eventually gets appointed as a bodyguard to famous actress Maya. He wins over the confidence of Maya and Phalguni along with their family. The real purpose of his visit to India is to trace the psychiatrist killer of his brother and thinks that Maya has some special relationship with the killer. He manages to almost convince her that she might be the killer of his brother when a don Kishore, who is after Maya, kidnaps her and keep her in a remote place. Meanwhile, her friend Ananth who is aware of this entire incident, is also abducted. Then enters a specially appointed DCP Vishnu who interrogates everyone involved in this case.

Cast 
 Aditya as Samarth
Dr. Vishnuvardhan in a guest appearance as DCP Vishnu
Prema as Phalguni
 Kiran Rathod as Maya
 Dileep Raj as Ananth
 Kishore as Kishore
 Ashutosh Rana as Rana
 Sridevika
 Sowmya
 Nagesh
 Ramesh
 Uday Jadugar
 Arun sagar
 Ravi nayak

Soundtrack

References

External links 
 Indiaglitz Review
 Kshana Kshana Songs list
 Deccan Herald review

2007 films
2000s Kannada-language films
2007 crime thriller films
Indian crime thriller films
Films scored by R. P. Patnaik
Films directed by Sunil Kumar Desai